Thug Matrix 3 is the seventh album by the hip hop artist Tragedy Khadafi. It was released on September 20, 2011.

Track listing

References

2011 albums
Tragedy Khadafi albums
Albums produced by Ayatollah
Albums produced by AraabMuzik